Birbhum district is an administrative unit in the Indian state of West Bengal. It is the northernmost district of Burdwan division—one of the five administrative divisions of West Bengal. The district headquarters is in Suri. Other important cities are Bolpur, Rampurhat and Sainthia. Jamtara, Dumka and Pakur districts of the state of Jharkhand lie at the western border of this district; the border in other directions is covered by the districts of Bardhaman and Murshidabad of West Bengal.

Often called "the land of red soil", Birbhum is noted for its topography and its cultural heritage which is somewhat different from the other districts in West Bengal. The western part of Birbhum is a bushy region, a part of the Chota Nagpur Plateau. This region gradually merges with the fertile alluvial farmlands in the east.

This district saw many cultural and religious movements in history. The Visva Bharati University at Santiniketan, established by Rabindranath Tagore, is one of the places Birbhum is known for. Many festivals are celebrated in the district, including Poush Mela.

Birbhum is primarily an agricultural district with around 75% of the population being dependent on agriculture. Principal industries of the district include cotton and silk harvesting and weaving, rice and oilseed milling, lac harvesting, stone mining and metalware and pottery manufacture. Bakreshwar Thermal Power Station is the only heavy industry in the district.

Etymology
The name Birbhum comes probably from the term 'land' ('bhumi') of the 'brave' ('bir') or Bir king'). Another theory says that the district bears the name of Bagdi king Bir Malla, who ruled in the area from 1501 to 1554 CE. Bir in the Santali language means forests; therefore, Birbhum could also mean a land of forests.

Geography

River Ajay forms the southern base and the apex of the triangle points north. The river forms the boundary between the districts of Birbhum and Bardhaman. The state of Jharkhand is at the northern and the western border of Birbhum and Murshidabad is at the east.

Geographically, this area lies at the northeastern end of the Chota Nagpur Plateau, as it slopes down and merges with the alluvial plains of the Ganges. In the district there is only hilly area of natural rock formation situated near Dubrajpur town called Mama Bhagne Pahar (Hill). The western portion of the district is historically known as Vajjabhumi or Bajrabhumi. It is an undulating upland that is generally barren. The comparatively more fertile eastern portion, constituting the northeastern Rarh region, merges with the Gangetic plain. Vajjabhumi is included in the Rarh region, and the rest of Rarh is called Sumha to differentiate it from Vajjabhumi.

Climate

The climate on the western side is dry and extreme but is relatively milder on the eastern side. Rainfall is higher in the western areas as compared to the eastern areas.

Climate and rainfall chart of Birbhum District:

Rivers
A number of rivers flow across Birbhum. Some of the most notable include Ajay, Mayurakshi, Kopai, Bakreshwar, Brahmani, Dwarka, Hinglo, and Bansloi. Almost all the rivers originate higher up on the Chota Nagpur plateau and flow across Birbhum in a west–east direction. During the monsoon season, the rivers flow high and swift compared to the dry summer season, resulting in a cycle of floods and droughts.

History

Prehistory 

The area now known as Birbhum was inhabited from pre-historic times. Some of the archaeological sites related to Pandu Rajar Dhibi of chalcolithic remains are located in Birbhum. Stone age implements have been found at several places in the district.

According to the old Jain book Acaranga Sutra, the last (24th) great Tirthankara Mahavira had wandered through this land, referred to as the "pathless country of Ladha in Vajjabhumi and Subbhabhumi (probably Suhma)" in the fifth century BCE. According to some historians, the spread of Jainism and Buddhism in the Rarh region was part of the process of Aryanisation of the area. Based on Divyabdan, a Buddhist text, Dr. Atul Sur has inferred that Gautam Buddha probably traversed this area to go to Pundravardhana and Samatata.

The Rarh region, once a part of the Maurya empire was later included in the empires of the imperial Guptas, Shashanka and Harshavardhana. After dismemberment of Harshavardhana's empire, the region was ruled by the Palas, under whose rule Buddhism, particularly the Vajrayana cult, flourished. In the seventh century CE, the Chinese traveller Xuanzang described some of the monasteries he visited in the region. In the 12th century CE, the Sena dynasty took control of the area.

Medieval age

The region was ruled by Muslims in the 13th century CE, although their control over the western parts of the district appears to have been minimal, with true power resting in the hands of the local Hindu chiefs, known as the Bir Rajas (Bagdi Malla dynasty). The towns of Hetampur, Birsinghpur and Rajnagar contain their relics. Hetampur and Rajnagar Kingdoms ruled most of Birbhum and parts of Burdwan, Maldah and Jharkhand from Dubrajpur (meaning two kingdoms - Hetampur & Rajnagar). Minhaj-i-Siraj, the author of the Tabaqat-i-Nasiri, mentions Lakhnur as the thanah (headquarters) of the Rarh wing of the Muslim rule and an important frontier post. The location of Lakhnur, though not yet identified, falls in Birbhum.

Colonial era

The area which is now Birbhum district was badly impacted by the Great Bengal famine of 1770. Many villages were wiped out entirely, and even in large towns, over three quarters of households perished.

The administrative unit called Birbhum was first formed in 1787 under the British East India Company, as "District Beerbhoom". The area had previously been administered as a part of Murshidabad district. The original district was much larger than its modern incarnation.

In the late 18th century, Birbhum and surrounding areas were affected by more famines followed by a peasants' insurrection. Although the insurrection primarily targeted zamindars and the government, trading and manufacturing centres were also looted. In June 1789, the manufacturing town of Ilambazar was sacked, although it recovered and became a magnet for manufacturing and trade.

Until 1793, Birbhum included "Bishenpore" or Bishnupur, which is now part of the Bankura district. Until the 1857 Sepoy Mutiny, the Santhal Parganas was part of Birbhum; the district thus sprawled up to Deoghar in the west. The immediate reason then for separating the western tribal majority areas was the Santhal rebellion of 1855–56.

Economy

Birbhum is primarily an agricultural district with around 75% of the people dependent on agriculture. While  of land is occupied by forests,  of land is used for agricultural purposes. 91.02% of the population live in villages. Out of total 4,50,313 farmers(holding 3,20,610 hectares of land), 3,59,404 are marginal farmers(holding 1,41,813 hectares altogether), 63,374 are small farmers(holding 95,144 hectares altogether), 26,236 are semi-medium farmers(holding 76,998 hectares altogether), 1,290 are medium farmers(holding 6,215 hectare altogether), and 9 are large farmers (holding 440 hectares of land). The average size of land holding per farmer is 0.71 hectares. 6,07,172 people work as agricultural labourers in Birbhum. Major crops produced in the district include rice, legumes, wheat, corn (maize), potatoes and sugar cane. The district has thirteen cold storages. Land with irrigation facilities in 2001-02 totalled . There are five barrages, providing irrigation support. Canada Dam on the Mayurakshi river at Massanjore lies close to the border of Birbhum and the Dumka district in Jharkhand. Further down the Mayurakshi is the Tilpara Barrage at Suri.

Birbhum is a major centre of cottage industries. Perhaps the most notable cottage industry is a non-profit rural organisation named Amar Kutir. Other main industries in Birbhum are agriculture-based industries, textiles, forestry, arts and crafts. Sriniketan is noted for its dairy industry and as a forestry centre. Some of the notable forms of cottage industries of Birbhum include textile—especially cotton and locally harvested tussar silk, jute works, batik, kantha stitch, macramé (weaving by knotting threads), leather, pottery and terracotta, solapith, woodcarving, bamboo and cane craft, metal works and tribal crafts. There are 8,883 small and medium scale industries. Principal industries of the district include cotton and silk harvesting and weaving, rice and oilseed milling, lac harvesting, and metalware and pottery manufacture. Bakreshwar Thermal Power Station (210 MW x 3 + 210 MW x 2 under construction) is the only heavy industry in the district.

Sainthia is known as business capital of Birbhum and an economically important city. Sainthia is the major centre for export and import of cottage industries. Huge numbers of businesses run in this city and its economy stands tall due to sales of agricultural based products.

In 2006 the Ministry of Panchayati Raj named Birbhum one of the country's 250 most backward districts (out of a total of 640). It is one of the eleven districts in West Bengal currently receiving funds from the Backward Regions Grant Fund Programme (BRGF).

Political and administrative divisions
The district comprises three subdivisions: Suri Sadar, Bolpur and Rampurhat. Suri is the district headquarters. There are 26 police stations, 19 development blocks, 6 municipalities and 167 gram panchayats in this district. Other than municipality area, each subdivision contains community development blocs which in turn are divided into rural areas and census towns. There are seven urban units: six municipalities and one census town. The latest amongst the urban units to have a municipality was Nalhati in 2000.

Before delimitation the district was divided into 12 assembly constituencies (AC):Nanoor (AC #283), Bolpur (AC #284), Labhpur (AC #285), Dubrajpur (AC #286), Rajnagar (AC #287), Suri (AC #288), Mahammad Bazar (AC #289), Mayureswar (AC #290), Rampurhat (AC #291), Hansan (AC #292), Nalhati (AC #293) and Murarai (AC #294). The constituencies of Nanoor, Rajnagar, Mayureswar and Hansan were reserved for Scheduled Castes (SC) candidates. Vidhan Sabha was elected in 2006 assembly elections, which took place before the rearrangement of parliamentary and assembly constituencies as per order of the Delimitation Commission in respect of the delimitation of constituencies in the West Bengal. Delimitation was made effective for all elections in the state of West Bengal that was held on or after 19 February 2008. 2009 Indian general election was based on the newly formed parliamentary constituencies and the newly formed assembly constituencies have representatives in the 2011 elections of West Bengal.

As per order of the Delimitation Commission in respect of the delimitation of constituencies in the West Bengal, the district is divided into 11 assembly constituencies:

Dubrajpur, Suri,Mayureswar, Rampurhat, Hansan, Nalhati and Murarai assembly segments form the Birbhum (Lok Sabha constituency). Bolpur, Nanoor, Labhpur, and Sainthia constituencies are part of Bolpur (Lok Sabha constituency), which will contain three other assembly segments from Bardhaman district.

Transport

The Panagarh–Morgram Highway runs through the district. All the towns and villages are connected by roads. The total length of roads in the district are: surfaced– and unsurfaced–. The Sahibganj Loop of the Eastern Railway, laid in 1862, passes through this district. There is a junction at Nalhati for the connection to Azimganj in Murshidabad district. The Andal-Sainthia Branch Line connects it to the main Howrah-Delhi main line at Andal.

Demographics
In 1901, Birbhum had a population of 902,280, which by 1981 rose to 2,095,829. According to the 2001 census data, the total population has further risen to 3,015,422. The following table summarises the population distribution:

According to the 2011 census Birbhum district has a population of 3,502,404, roughly equal to the nation of Lithuania or the US state of Connecticut. 
This gives it a ranking of 84th in India (out of a total of 640). Its population growth rate over the decade 2001-2011 was 16.15%. Birbhum has a sex ratio of 956 females for every 1000 males, and a literacy rate of 70.9%. Scheduled Castes and Scheduled Tribes made up 29.50% and 6.92% of the population respectively. Other than those speaking the local dialect of Bengali, there are tribal Santhals and ten other tribal communities in Birbhum with some presence, amongst whom Koda, Mahali and Oraons are more common.

Religion

According to 2011 Indian census, Hindus formed around 62% of the total population and Muslims over 37%. Muslims are in majority in Murarai I (58.92%), Murarai II (75.00%) and Nalhati II (70.10%) CD blocks in the northeast of the district, and have a significant presence in Nalhati I (46.64%), Rampurhat II (48.20%), and Ilambazar (47.40%) CD blocks. Others, including religious groups and non-religion population fall below 1% of the population. In the 2001 Indian census of the district, Hindus formed around 65% of the population while 33% were Muslims. There is a sprinkling of other religious groups in the population.

Language

At the time of the 2011 census, 92.38% of the population spoke Bengali and 6.01% Santali as their first language.

Culture

The bauls of Birbhum, their philosophy and their songs form a notable representation of the folk culture of the district. Birbhum has been home to kabiyals, kirtaniyas and other folk culture groups.

The numerous fairs in Birbhum start with Poush Mela at Santiniketan and follows through the Bengali month of Poush until Makar Sankranti. Particularly lively is the fair at Jaydev Kenduli. Festivities are organised across the seasons. People of Birbhum patronise folk entertainment programmes such as jatra, kavigan and alkap.

Many poets were born in this district, as for example, Chandidas (Rami). In addition to being a confluence of Vaishnava, Shakta and Saiva cultures, Birbhum villages observe ancient customs like worship of gramdevta (gram means village and devta means deity) in many forms.

Amongst the major attractions of Birbhum are Bakreshwar, Tarapith, Dwarbasini temple at Chondrapur and Patharchapuri. Birbhum has many old temples, such as the ones at Jaydev Kenduli, Surul and Nanoor, with delicate decorative tiles made of terra cotta (burnt clay).

Flora and fauna
The eastern area of Birbhum is a part of the rice plains of West Bengal, and the vegetation includes usual characteristics of rice fields in Bengal, such as species of Aponogeton, Utricularia, Drosera, Philcoxia, Scrophulariaceae and similar aquatic or palustrine genera. In the drier western region of the district, the characteristic shrubs and herbs include species of Wendlandia, Convolvulaceae, Stipa, Tragus, Spermacoce, Ziziphus, Capparis and similar plants that grows on laterite soil. Mango, palm, and bamboo are among common trees in Birbhum. Other common species of plants include jackfruit, arjun, sal, guava, kend and mahua.

Other than feral dogs and domestic cattle, the most frequently encountered non-human mammal is the hanuman, a long tailed grey langur prevalent in the Gangetic plain. Some wild boars and wolves may still be spotted in the small forests of Chinpai, Bandarsol and Charicha. Leopards and bears are not to be seen any more in the wild. Sometimes during the season when mahua trees bloom, wild Asiatic elephants from Jharkhand come in trampling crops and threatening life and property. Birds of Birbhum include a mix of hilly and plain-land dwelling species like partridge, pigeon, green pigeon, water fowls, doyel, Indian robin, drongo, hawk, cuckoo, koel, sunbird, Indian roller, parrot, babbler, and some migratory birds.

Ballabhpur Wildlife Sanctuary near Santiniketan was declared a sanctuary in 1977. Economically important trees are planted here and blackbucks, spotted deer, jackals, foxes and a variety of water birds live in its .

Literacy and education

According to the 2011 census Birbhum district had a literacy rate of 70.9%. up from 62.16% in 2001. In 1951 census, the literacy rate was 17.74%. It increased to 48.56% in 1991.

The growth of literacy in the last decade of the twentieth century was particularly remarkable with special emphasis on the eradication of illiteracy. While it is feared that Birbhum may not be able to fulfill the national objective of sending all children in the age group 6–14 years to school by 2010, efforts are on in that direction.

The district has 127 libraries supported by the government, one private library and one district library.

Sports
One of the most popular outdoor sports in the villages of Birbhum used to be danguli (literal meaning "ball and stick"). However, in recent times cricket has replaced some of its popularity. A sport that can be played outdoors and indoors and is popular among children is marbles, which involves projecting a striker bead with fingers to hit an ensemble of black or green glass beads.

In addition to cricket, the other most popular outdoor sports of this district are football and kabadi and volleyball.

Notable people

Amartya Sen, economist and Nobel laureate
Pranab Mukherjee, 13th President of India 
 Tarasankar Bandyopadhyay, Bengali novelist who was nominited for Nobel Prize in Literature in 1971.
 Ekram Ali, Bengali poet and critic
Sahana Bajpaie, Bengali singer-songwriter and one of the most prominent contemporary Rabindra Sangeet vocalists
Sutapa Biswas, British Indian conceptual artist 
 Ananda Mohan Chakrabarty, Indian American microbiologist, scientist, and researcher, most notable for his work in directed evolution
Basudeb Das Baul, Bengali baul singer 
 Sumitra Devi, actress who worked in Hindi and Bengali cinema during the 1940s and 1950s 
 Kharaj Mukherjee, Indian actor who works in Bengali as well as Hindi cinema
Chandidas Rami, 14th-century poet born in Nanoor 
 Satyendra Prasanna Sinha, prominent lawyer and statesman in British India
Nityananda Swami, co–founder of Vaishnavism, born at Ekachakra
 Rabindranath Tagore, polymath and founder of Visva-Bharati University
 Abdus Sattar, former President and Vice President of Bangladesh
 Mohammad Kibria, Bangladeshi artist
Muhammad Qudrat-i-Khuda, Bangladeshi organic chemist, educationist and writer.
Ganga Narayan Singh, Indian tribal revolutionary

Villages
 

Suhudighi
Kondaipur
Joplai
Paikar

References

External links

 
 
 Bengal District Gazetteers Birbhum, O'Malley L.S.S., 1910, Barcode(6010010076002), Language English from Digital Library of India

 
Districts of West Bengal
Minority Concentrated Districts in India
1787 establishments in British India